A New Nightmare is the first mixtape (or extended play) by American hip hop duo Twiztid, and is their 11th major release overall. It was self-released on July 30, 2013, marking the group's first project since leaving Psychopathic Records in December 2012. First released on the group's official website store, it was released nationwide on September 3, 2013, and re-released on November 20, 2018 via Majik Ninja Entertainment. Recording sessions took place at "The Disc". Production was handled by Michael "Seven" Summers, Eric Davie, and the Dead Beatz. In regards to Twiztid's prior albums, A New Nightmare featured the most guest appearances overall, such as AJAX, Blaze Ya Dead Homie, Bukshot, Caskey, Danny Boone of Rehab, DJ Swamp, Dominic, Irv Da Phenom, Jared Gomes of (həd) p.e., JellyRoll, Johnny Richter, Lil Wyte, Liquid Assassin, Mickey Avalon, Swollen Members, The R.O.C., Wrekonize of ¡Mayday!, Aqualeo, and Anybody Killa.

The album peaked at number 115 on the Billboard 200, at number 17 on the Top Rap Albums, and at number 23 on the Independent Albums in the United States.

Track listing

Personnel

Jamie "Madrox" Spaniolo – main performer
Paul "Monoxide" Methric – main performer
Benjamin Miller – performer (track 2)
Yeshe Perl – performer (track 3)
Danny "Boone" Alexander – performer (track 3)
Dominic – performer (tracks: 4, 6)
Brandon Caskey – performer (track 4)
Chris Rouleau – performer (tracks: 5, 7)
Mitchell Irving Jr. – performer (track 6)
AJAX – performer (track 7)
Tim Kalbfleisch – performer (track 7)
Paulo Sergio "Jared" Gomes – performer (track 7)
Jason DeFord – performer (track 7)
Patrick Lanshaw – performer (track 7)
Timothy McNutt – performer (track 7)
Cardell Avila Toombs – performer (track 7)
Swollen Members – performers (track 8)
Bryan Jones – performer (track 9)
DJ Swamp – scratches
Eric Davie – producer (track 1), additional producer (track 9), engineering
The Dead Beatz – producer (tracks: 2, 4, 8)
Michael "Seven" Summers – producer (tracks: 3, 5-7, 9)
Joe Strange – mixing
Jim Neve – artwork
Matt Fenner – artwork
Jason Shaltz – photography
George Vlahakis – management
James Lowery – performer (track 10)
Aqualeo – performer (track 10)

Charts

References

External links

Twiztid albums
2013 mixtape albums
Albums produced by Seven (record producer)